The Harry B. Ingraham Three-Decker is a historic triple decker house in Worcester, Massachusetts.  It was built c. 1892 for Harry B. Ingraham, an absentee owner based in Boston.  When listed on the National Register of Historic Places in 1990, the building was specially noted for its fine Queen Anne styling, but much of this has been lost due to later exterior refinishing (see photo from 2012).  The porches on the front were supported by narrow turned posts with decorative brackets, and third floor porch had a Stick Style frieze across its top.  The house was sheathed in wood clapboard, although there were bands of cut shingles providing a decorative touch.  The house has since been sided in synthetic sided, and its upper porch details have been replaced by simpler designs.

The building was listed on the National Register of Historic Places in 1990.

See also
National Register of Historic Places listings in southwestern Worcester, Massachusetts
National Register of Historic Places listings in Worcester County, Massachusetts

References

Apartment buildings in Worcester, Massachusetts
Apartment buildings on the National Register of Historic Places in Massachusetts
Queen Anne architecture in Massachusetts
Houses completed in 1892
National Register of Historic Places in Worcester, Massachusetts